The following is a list of Sites of Special Scientific Interest in the North Wester Ross and Cromarty Area of Search.  For other areas, see List of SSSIs by Area of Search.

 Achnahaird
 An Teallach
 Ardlair - Letterewe
 Beinn Dearg
 Cailleach Head
 Corrieshalloch Gorge
 Creag Chorcurach
 Dundonnell Woods
 Fannich Hills
 Inverpolly
 Knockan Cliff
 Meall an-t-Sithe and Creag Rainich
 Priest Island
 Rhidorroch Woods
 Rubha Dunan

 
North Wester Ross and Cromarty